The 78th parallel north is a circle of latitude that is 78 degrees north of the Earth's equatorial plane, in the Arctic. It crosses the Atlantic Ocean, Europe, Asia, the Arctic Ocean and North America. It is the southernmost integral parallel north that does not pass through any continental mainland (being slightly to the north of Cape Chelyuskin).

At this latitude the sun is visible for 24 hours, 0 minutes during the summer solstice and nautical twilight during the winter solstice.

Around the world
Starting at the Prime Meridian and heading eastwards, the parallel 78° north passes through:

{| class="wikitable plainrowheaders"
! scope="col" width="125" | Co-ordinates
! scope="col" | Country, territory or sea
! scope="col" | Notes
|-
| style="background:#b0e0e6;" | 
! scope="row" style="background:#b0e0e6;" | Atlantic Ocean
| style="background:#b0e0e6;" | Greenland Sea
|-
| 
! scope="row" | 
| Svalbard - island of Spitsbergen
|-
| style="background:#b0e0e6;" | 
! scope="row" style="background:#b0e0e6;" | Storfjorden
| style="background:#b0e0e6;" |
|-
| 
! scope="row" | 
| Svalbard - island of Edgeøya
|-
| style="background:#b0e0e6;" | 
! scope="row" style="background:#b0e0e6;" | Barents Sea
| style="background:#b0e0e6;" |
|-
| style="background:#b0e0e6;" | 
! scope="row" style="background:#b0e0e6;" | Kara Sea
| style="background:#b0e0e6;" |
|-
| 
! scope="row" | 
| Severnaya Zemlya - Bolshevik Island
|-
| style="background:#b0e0e6;" | 
! scope="row" style="background:#b0e0e6;" | Kara Sea
| style="background:#b0e0e6;" |
|-
| style="background:#b0e0e6;" | 
! scope="row" style="background:#b0e0e6;" | Laptev Sea
| style="background:#b0e0e6;" | Passing just south of Maly Taymyr Island, 
|-
| style="background:#b0e0e6;" | 
! scope="row" style="background:#b0e0e6;" | Arctic Ocean
| style="background:#b0e0e6;" |
|-
| 
! scope="row" | 
| Northwest Territories - Brock Island
|-
| style="background:#b0e0e6;" | 
! scope="row" style="background:#b0e0e6;" | Wilkins Strait
| style="background:#b0e0e6;" |
|-valign="top"
| 
! scope="row" | 
| Northwest Territories - Mackenzie King Island Nunavut - Mackenzie King Island
|-
| style="background:#b0e0e6;" | 
! scope="row" style="background:#b0e0e6;" | Prince Gustav Adolf Sea
| style="background:#b0e0e6;" |
|-
| style="background:#b0e0e6;" | 
! scope="row" style="background:#b0e0e6;" | Maclean Strait
| style="background:#b0e0e6;" |
|-
| style="background:#b0e0e6;" | 
! scope="row" style="background:#b0e0e6;" | Danish Strait
| style="background:#b0e0e6;" | Passing just north of King Christian Island, Nunavut, 
|-
| 
! scope="row" | 
| Nunavut - Ellef Ringnes Island
|-
| style="background:#b0e0e6;" | 
! scope="row" style="background:#b0e0e6;" | Hassel Sound
| style="background:#b0e0e6;" |
|-
| 
! scope="row" | 
| Nunavut - Amund Ringnes Island
|-
| style="background:#b0e0e6;" | 
! scope="row" style="background:#b0e0e6;" | Norwegian Bay
| style="background:#b0e0e6;" |
|-
| style="background:#b0e0e6;" | 
! scope="row" style="background:#b0e0e6;" | Baumann Fiord
| style="background:#b0e0e6;" |
|-
| 
! scope="row" | 
| Nunavut - Ellesmere Island
|-
| style="background:#b0e0e6;" | 
! scope="row" style="background:#b0e0e6;" | Nares Strait 
| style="background:#b0e0e6;" |
|-
| 
! scope="row" | 
| Kavigarssuk
|-
| 
! scope="row" | 
| Alabama Nunatak
|-
| style="background:#b0e0e6;" | 
! scope="row" style="background:#b0e0e6;" | Atlantic Ocean
| style="background:#b0e0e6;" | Greenland Sea
|-
|}

See also 
77th parallel north
79th parallel north

n78
Geography of the Arctic